In algebraic geometry, a crepant resolution  of a singularity is a resolution that does not affect the canonical class of the manifold.

The crepant resolution conjecture of  states that the orbifold cohomology of a Gorenstein orbifold is isomorphic to a semiclassical limit of the quantum cohomology of a crepant resolution.

In 2 dimensions, crepant resolutions of complex Gorenstein quotient singularities (du Val singularities) always exist and are unique, in 3 dimensions they exist but need not be unique as they can be related by flops, and in dimensions greater than 3 they need not exist.

A substitute for crepant resolutions which always exists is a terminal model. Namely, for every variety X over a field of characteristic zero such that X has canonical singularities (for example, rational Gorenstein singularities), there is a variety Y with Q-factorial terminal singularities and a birational projective morphism f: Y → X which is crepant in the sense that KY = f*KX.

Notes

References

Algebraic geometry
Singularity theory